"8th Wonder" is a 1980 single by the American hip hop trio the Sugarhill Gang, originally released on Sugar Hill. It was later included in the 1981 album 8th Wonder.

Chart performance
The song charted at #82 on the Billboard Hot 100 in the United States.

In popular culture
A slowed down version of the music from this song is used in the DVD menus for the series Trailer Park Boys, as the backing of a song performed by the character of Tyrone.
The song was also featured in the 1983 PBS documentary Style Wars.

Sampling

Samples Used
The song sampled two others:
"Ever Ready" by Johnnie Taylor (1978)
"Daisy Lady" by 7th Wonder (1979)

Samples taken
The song, in turn, has been sampled over twenty times, including in:
 "The Adventures of Grandmaster Flash on the Wheels of Steel" by Grandmaster Flash and the Furious Five (1981)
 "Public Enemy No.1" by Public Enemy (1987)
 "Shake Your Rump" by Beastie Boys (1989)
 "Rap Promoter" by A Tribe Called Quest (1991)
 "Back Up Off Me!" by Dr. Dre and Ed Lover feat. T-Money (1994)
 "Woo Hah!! Got You All in Check" by Busta Rhymes (1996)
 "Never Mind" by 112 (1998)
 "Gangster Trippin'" by Fatboy Slim (1998)
 "K.O.B.E." by Kobe Bryant ft Tyra Banks (2000)
 "I'm Gonna Be Alright" by Jennifer Lopez (2001)

References

External links

1980 songs
1980 singles
The Sugarhill Gang songs